Tadeusz Czesław Malinowski (8 April 1932 – 20 December 2018) was a Polish scientist and archaeologist specialising in the Bronze Age and early Iron Age.

Early life and education 
Born in Poznań, Poland, Malinowski was the son of Czesława Malinowska (born Brożek) and Czesław Pobóg Malinowski. His brother is Andrzej Paweł Malinowski, a Polish anthropologist.

As a child, Malinowski witnessed the Second World War. After his father escaped to the United Kingdom and his mother was arrested by the Gestapo, he lived through the Nazi occupation of Poland with his extended family in Radom and Lublin.

He studied archaeology at Adam Mickiewicz University in Poznań, where he received his doctoral title in 1960 and his habilitation in 1969. His main teachers were Józef Kostrzewski, Witold Hensel, and Eugeniusz Frankowski. By the time he received his doctorate, he had written 47 scientific publications. In 1980, he became a professor.

Career 
He worked in the Museum of Archaeology in Poznań from 1950 to 1975, as a professor at the Higher Pedagogical School in Słupsk until 1993, and at the University of Zielona Góra until 2002. He lectured in the Department of Archaeology at the University of Lodz from 1973 to 1974, at the Institute of Archaeology and Ethnography of the Nicolaus Copernicus University in Toruń from 1979 to 1980, and at the School of Social Skills in Poznań from 2002 to 2004.
Malinowski has participated in numerous archaeological excavations in Greater Poland and beyond. He was a member of a team that researched an early settlement in Saint-Jean-le-Froid, France, in the department of Aveyron. In Poland, he has studied fortified settlements from the early Iron Age in Słupca, Smuszewo, and Komorowo. He also worked on a late medieval cemetery on Rowokół hill in Smołdzino, and on an early medieval cemetery in Komorowo.

He was the author of over 380 scientific and popular publications, including more than a dozen books published in Poland and abroad. After he retired, his extensive collection of books (several thousand volumes), illustrative material (photographs and drawings), and slides were purchased by the University of Rzeszów for its Institute of Archaeology.

As a professor emeritus, Malinowski lived in Poznań, where he reviewed doctoral works and habilitations and continued his scientific research and writing.

Scientific research 
Malinowski's research mainly dealt with Central European funeral rites in prehistory and the early Middle Ages. He also studied the meaning of amber in prehistory and the early Middle Ages in Europe, facial representations in ceramic rituals in prehistorical Europe, and musical instruments from prehistory to modern times in Central Europe. Further, he worked on Slavic ethnogenesis issues and conducted interdisciplinary research in prehistory. Through 25 years of work at the Museum of Archaeology in Poznań, he specialised in archaeological museology.

Other work 
Malinowski was vice-president of the Trade Union of Workers of Culture and Arts in Poznań from 1970 to 1973. With his brother, Andrzej, he published the book Wspomnienia z obozów: Majdanek-Oświęcim-Ravensbrück-Neu Rohlau-Zwodau (2008) on the diaries of their mother, who survived several Nazi concentration camps during World War II. He was featured in the documentary film Resettlement by Filip Antoni Malinowski in 2012.

He was married to archaeologist Maria Malinowska (born Konieczna in 1932 in Poznań). They have a daughter, Anna, and a son, Antoni.

Honours and recognitions 
 1978: Cross of Merit (Poland)
 1990: Knight's Cross, Order of Polonia Restituta
 1998: Medal of the Commission of National Education

Memberships 
 1957: Poznań Society of Friends of Learning (Poznańskie Towarzystwo Przyjaciół Nauk)
 1967: Current Anthropology, University of Chicago
 1973: Poznań Committee of Sciences, Department of Archaeology (Komitet Archeologii Oddział PAN w Poznaniu)
 1983: Study Group on Music Archaeology, Hanover, Germany
 1990: Committee on Science, Work, and Protohistory (Komitet Nauk Pra- i Protohistorycznych PAN)
 1993: Committee for Archaeology in Wrocław (Komitet Archeologii Oddział PAN in Wrocław)
 1999: Lubusz Scientific Society (Lubuskie Towarzystwo Naukowe)

Selected publications

Books 
 Katalog cmentarzysk ludności kultury łużyckiej w Polsce, Vol. 1–2, Warsaw, Instytut Historii Kultury Materialnej PAN (1961)
 Obrządek pogrzebowy ludności kultury pomorskiej, Wrocław/Warsaw/Kraków, Ossolineum (1969)
 Katalog cmentarzysk ludności kultury pomorskiej, Vol. 1–3, Pedagogical School of Słupsk (1979–1981)
 Wielkopolska w otchłani wieków, Poznań, Wydawnictwo Poznańskie (1985)
 Laski. Materiały z cmentarzyska kultury łużyckiej, Part 1–4, Pedagogical School of Słupsk (1988–1991)
 Komorowo, stanowisko 1: grodzisko kultury łużyckiej – faktoria na szlaku bursztynowym, University of Rzeszów, (2006)

Scientific publications 
 "Grodziska kultury łużyckiej w Wielkopolsce", Fontes Archaeologici Posnanienses, Vol. 5, 1955
 "Obrządek pogrzebowy ludności kultury łużyckiej w Polsce", Przegląd Archeologiczny, Vol. 14, 1962
 "Problem pogranicza prasłowiańsko-prailiryjskiego", Slavia Antiqua, Vol. 21, 1975
 "Les hochets en argile dans la civilisation lusacienne de Pologne (age du bronze – age du fer)", in: "La pluridisciplinarite en archeologie musicale", Vol. 1, Paris, 1994
 "Niektóre zagadnienia rozwoju kulturowego u schyłku epoki brązu i we wczesnej epoce żelaza w Europie Środkowej", in: "Kultura pomorska i kultura grobów kloszowych", Warsaw, 1995
 "Łaba – Odra – Wisła: oddziaływania kulturowe u schyłku epoki brązu i we wczesnej epoce żelaza", in: "Rola Odry i Łaby w przemianach kulturowych epoki brązu i epoki żelaza", Wrocław-Gliwice, 1997

References

Bibliography 
 Księga jubileuszowa: Miscellanea archaeologica Thaddaeo Malinowski dedicata, edited by Franciszek Rożnowski, Słupsk/Poznań, 1993, Pedagogical School of Słupsk
 Opuscula archaeologica – Opera dedicata in Professorem Thaddeum Malinowski, edited by Wojciech Dzieduszycki, University of Zielona Góra, 2007
 Enzyklopädisches Handbuch zur Ur- und Frühgeschichte Europas, edited by Jan Filip, Vol. 2, Prag, 1969; Vol. 3, Praha, 1998
 Fifth International Directory of Anthropologists, Chicago/London, 1975
 Współcześni Uczeni Polscy, Słownik Biograficzny, Vol. III, M-R, edited by Janusz Kapuścik, Warsaw, 2006, Ośrodek Przetwarzania Informacji

External links 
 Tadeusz Malinowski – an interview with Radio Zielona Góra from 2002 (Polish)
 Resettlement – the website of a documentary film featuring Tadeusz Malinowski and Maria Malinowska, directed by Filip Antoni Malinowski, 2012
 Institute of Archaeology of the University in Rzeszów – the institute that acquired Malinowski's scientific materials
 Available literature of Tadeusz Malinowski on the portal w.bibliotece.pl

1932 births
2018 deaths
Adam Mickiewicz University in Poznań alumni
Academic staff of Adam Mickiewicz University in Poznań
Academic staff of Nicolaus Copernicus University in Toruń
20th-century Polish archaeologists